Synergy North Corporation is a municipally-owned local power distribution company which services the cities of Thunder Bay and Kenora in Ontario, Canada. It was formed on January 1, 2019 through the merger of Kenora Hydro and Thunder Bay Hydro.

The company is headquartered in Thunder Bay and governed by a 16-member board of directors, 8 members appointed by the Thunder Bay City Council and 8 appointed by Kenora City Council.

Thunder Bay Hydro
Thunder Bay Hydro was formed in 1970 when Fort William Hydro and the Port Arthur Public Utilities Commission were merged coinciding with the amalgamation of towns Fort William and Port Arthur.

References

External links
 

Electric power companies of Canada
Companies owned by municipalities of Canada
Companies based in Thunder Bay
Municipal government of Thunder Bay
Kenora
2019 establishments in Ontario
Canadian companies established in 2019